Enispe intermedia is a butterfly found in South Asia that belongs to the Morphinae subfamily of the brush-footed butterflies family.

Distribution
It ranges among Assam, Manipur, Myanmar, Thailand, peninsular Malaysia and Sumatra.

See also
List of butterflies of India
List of butterflies of India (Morphinae)
List of butterflies of India (Nymphalidae)

Cited references

References
 
 
 

Amathusiini
Butterflies of Indochina